Bhavana Gawali  (born 23 May 1974) is a five timer Member of Parliament  representing Yavatmal-Washim Lok Sabha. She is serving as a Member of Parliament for this constituency since 1999. She is currently the senior most Member of Parliament from Maharashtra(25 years in office) She was also a member of the 13th Lok Sabha, 14th Lok Sabha, 15th Lok Sabha, 16th Lok Sabha and 17th Lok Sabha. She is a member of Shivsena.

The Enforcement Directorate (ED) raided several locations linked to Gawali on 30 August 2021.

Positions held

References

External links
 Shiv Sena official website 
 Bhavana Gawali Lok Sabha Profile
 Official biographical sketch in Parliament of India website

Living people
1973 births
Shiv Sena politicians
India MPs 1999–2004
India MPs 2004–2009
India MPs 2009–2014
India MPs 2014–2019
India MPs 2019–present
Marathi politicians
Lok Sabha members from Maharashtra
People from Washim district
People from Yavatmal district
Women in Maharashtra politics
21st-century Indian women politicians
21st-century Indian politicians
Women members of the Lok Sabha
20th-century Indian women
20th-century Indian people